A DNase footprinting assay is a DNA footprinting technique from molecular biology/biochemistry that detects DNA-protein interaction using the fact that a protein bound to DNA will often protect that DNA from enzymatic cleavage. This makes it possible to locate a protein binding site on a particular DNA molecule. The method uses an enzyme, deoxyribonuclease (DNase, for short), to cut the radioactively end-labeled DNA, followed by gel electrophoresis to detect the resulting cleavage pattern.

For example, the DNA fragment of interest may be PCR amplified using a 32P 5' labeled primer, with the result being many DNA molecules with a radioactive label on one end of one strand of each double stranded molecule. Cleavage by DNase will produce fragments. The fragments which are smaller with respect to the 32P-labelled end will appear further on the gel than the longer fragments. The gel is then used to expose a special photographic film.

The cleavage pattern of the DNA in the absence of a DNA binding protein, typically referred to as free DNA, is compared to the cleavage pattern of DNA in the presence of a DNA binding protein. If the protein binds DNA, the binding site is protected from enzymatic cleavage. This protection will result in a clear area on the gel which is referred to as the "footprint".

By varying the concentration of the DNA-binding protein, the binding affinity of the protein can be estimated according to the minimum concentration of protein at which a footprint is observed.

This technique was developed by David Galas and Albert Schmitz at Geneva in 1977

See also
 DNA footprinting
 DNase I
 Toeprinting assay

References

Biochemistry detection methods
Molecular biology
Laboratory techniques